Adam Nable (born 4 September 1975) is an Australian former professional rugby league footballer who played in the 1990s and 2000s. He played for the Manly-Warringah Sea Eagles, Wakefield Trinity (Heritage № 1091), Balmain Tigers, Wests Tigers and North Queensland Cowboys. He later played for the New York Knights in the AMNRL, and was vice-captain there. He is the brother of player-turned-filmmaker Matt Nable.

Playing career
Nable made his first grade debut for Manly-Warringah in Round 22 1995, coming off the bench in a 32-4 victory over South Sydney at Brookvale Oval.  This would be Nable's only appearance for Manly.  The club would go on to win the minor premiership but were defeated in the grand final by Canterbury-Bankstown.

In 1997, Nable joined Balmain and became a regular in the team over the next 3 seasons.  Nable played in the club's final top grade game as a stand-alone entity which was against the Canberra Raiders at Bruce Stadium in Round 26 1999.  Balmain lost the match 42-14.

At the end of 1999, Balmain merged with fellow foundation club Western Suburbs to form the Wests Tigers.  Nable was one of the Balmain players chosen to represent the new side.  Nable played in the club's inaugural game which was against the Brisbane Broncos in Round 1 2000.  The match ended in a 24-24 draw at Campbelltown Stadium.

At the end of the 2000 season, Nable was released by Wests and he joined North Queensland for the 2001 season.  Nable made one appearance for North Queensland which came against Penrith in Round 4 2001 at Cazaly's Stadium.

External links 
 https://web.archive.org/web/20080505140349/http://www.newyorkknightsrugby.com/profiles_14.php

Footnotes

References
 Whiticker, Alan and Hudson, Glen; The Encyclopedia of Rugby League Players; published 2005 by BAS publishing, f16/171 Collins St, Melbourne, Vic., 3000

1975 births
Living people
Australian rugby league players
Balmain Tigers players
Manly Warringah Sea Eagles players
New York Knights players
North Queensland Cowboys players
People from Wodonga
Wakefield Trinity players
Wests Tigers players
Rugby league players from Victoria